Robert C. Atchley (1939 – 13 November 2018) was an American gerontologist and sociologist.

Atchley graduated from Miami University in 1961, and taught at his alma mater from 1966 (named Distinguished Professor in 1986) to 1998, when he joined the Naropa University faculty. Atchley led the American Society on Aging from 1988 to 1990 as president, and founded the journal Contemporary Gerontology.

References

1939 births
2018 deaths
American gerontologists
Miami University faculty
Miami University alumni
Naropa University faculty
Academic journal editors